6 Sagittarii is a massive, orange-hued star in the southern zodiac constellation of Sagittarius. With an apparent visual magnitude of 6.27, it is just below the nominal brightness limit for visibility with the typical naked eye under ideal viewing conditions.

This is an evolved giant star with a stellar classification of K2 III. It is only 25 million years old and has around ten times the mass of the Sun. The star is radiating about 6,817 times the Sun's luminosity from its photosphere at an effective temperature of 3,778 K. It appears to be a source of extended infrared excess, but this emission may be due to intervening cirrus.

References

K-type giants
Runaway stars
Sagittarius (constellation)
Durchmusterung objects
Sagittarii, 06
164358
088258
6715